In Japanese culture, π/ ( or , Romanized Paisurasshu, pai sura, paisura or pai slash) denotes the appearance of a woman's breasts bisected by a diagonal strap (slash), such as an automobile shoulder harness or purse worn cross-body. The term involves a play on words of the Japanese word for breasts, oppai. The term began to appear on the Internet in June 2006.

See also 

 Cleavage (breasts)

References 

 
 

Japanese sex terms
Japanese popular culture
human appearance